"Rescue Me" is a 1997 song recorded by German band Bell, Book & Candle. It is their first and most successful single and was released on the band's first studio album, Read My Sign (1998). The song is sung by band member Jana Gross and was an international hit, peaking at number two in Austria, number three in Germany and Spain, number six in Switzerland and number eight in Sweden. "Rescue Me" was awarded platinum in Germany and Austria, and gold in Sweden and Spain.

Critical reception
AllMusic editor Tom Demalon described the song as a "Celtic-tinged march" in his review of Read My Sign. He noted further that the lyrics "are long on affairs of the heart and Gross' delivery manages to give them mileage when they become trite." Chuck Taylor from Billboard said it is a "full-bodied anthemic midtempo number, which at times is as reminiscent of new age vocalist Enya as it is of rockers the Cranberries." He noted that the melody is "simply enchanting and instantly accessible without crossing too far into pure pop territory. Given the right care and a serious marketing campaign from Blackbird". He also added that the track is "pure delight". Pan-European magazine Music & Media commented that "after a slow start, this Berlin trio's epic rock ballad has taken off in a big way—but it was touch and go for a while." A reviewer from New Straits Times called the song "refreshing and expressive".

One of the first programmers to feature the song was Bernhard Hiller, head of music at CHR station 104.6 RTL in Berlin. He recalled, "We started playing Rescue Me because they're a local band and we thought it would suit our format. But our research showed that it wasn't going down well with our audience. At first we couldn't believe it, but by the time it should have been all but dead, it started to take off in a big way." Hiller suggested that the fact that the band and the station cooperated on promotional activities on the record may have played a major role in its eventual success. He stated that "Now it's one of our very best-testing records."

Music video
A music video was produced to promote the single. It begins with a little boy, running across a grainfield to an old house. He goes up to the attic, where he finds a ship model and blows the dust off it. It appears as if the band is performing inside the ship itself. Every time the boy moves it, the room where the band stands starts to rock. Through a porthole-window, singer Jana Gross watches the camera while she sings. The boy puts the ship on a tub of water and splashes with the water. The band is then seen with water splashing to all sides. Towards the end, the ship is lowered into the water, and outside the window where Gross sings, the water slowly fills up. The boy watches the ship that is now at the bottom of the tub. As the video ends, he runs away through the grainfield. And Gross is seen through the porthole-window, now without water outside.

Track listing

Charts

Weekly charts

Year-end charts

References

1997 debut singles
1997 songs
English-language German songs
Logic Records singles
Pop rock songs